Stella Maris College is an all-boy catholic high school in Port Harcourt, the capital of Rivers State. The school is located in the Roman Catholic Diocese of Port Harcourt. Established in 1948, the school serves both as a day school and a boarding school. It is headed and run mainly by the Holy Ghost Reverend Fathers.

History 

Initially, the school was located at the site of the St. Mary’s Catholic Church in Aggrey Road. However, in October 1948, it moved to its present site at 34 Harbour Road in the Old Port Harcourt Township.

Former First Lady of Nigeria, Patience Jonathan began her teaching career at the Stella Maris College.

Notable alumni
Chukwunweike Idigbe - lawyer
Chibudom Nwuche - politician
uche Nwachukwu - Strategic Lead, 9os Nigeria

See also

List of schools in Port Harcourt
Roman Catholic Diocese of Port Harcourt

References

External links

Roman Catholic Diocese of Port Harcourt
Educational institutions established in 1948
Boys' schools in Rivers State
Schools in Port Harcourt
Spiritan schools
1948 establishments in Nigeria